Idrissa Sanou (born June 12, 1977) is a Burkinabé athlete specializing in the 100 metres. Sanou holds the national records in both 100 metres, 200 metres and 4 x 100 metres relay.

Sanou won a bronze medal at the 2002 African Championships in Radès, and a silver medal two years later in Brazzaville. Participating in the 2004 Summer Olympics in Athens, he achieved fourth place in his 100 metres heat, thus qualifying on due to time to the second round where he lost the race. He finished seventh at the 2006 African Championships and fourth at the 2008 African Championships. Sanou represented Burkina Faso at the 2008 Summer Olympics in Beijing. He competed at the 100 metres sprint and placed 6th in his heat without advancing to the second round. He ran the distance in a time of 10.63 seconds.

Competition record

References

External links
 

1977 births
Living people
Burkinabé male sprinters
Athletes (track and field) at the 2004 Summer Olympics
Athletes (track and field) at the 2008 Summer Olympics
Olympic athletes of Burkina Faso
Athletes (track and field) at the 1999 All-Africa Games
Athletes (track and field) at the 2003 All-Africa Games
Athletes (track and field) at the 2007 All-Africa Games
African Games competitors for Burkina Faso
Islamic Solidarity Games medalists in athletics
21st-century Burkinabé people